Inga hayesii is a species of plant in the family Fabaceae. It is found in Colombia, Costa Rica, Ecuador, Nicaragua, Panama, and Peru. It is threatened by habitat loss.

References

hayesii
Taxonomy articles created by Polbot